Helen Idahosa (born ) is a Nigerian female weightlifter, who competed in the +75 kg category, representing Nigeria at international competitions. 

She participated at the 2000 Summer Olympics in the +75 kg event. She competed at world championships, most recently at the 2001 World Weightlifting Championships.

Major results

References

External links
 
http://www.gettyimages.com/photos/helen-idahosa?excludenudity=true&sort=mostpopular&mediatype=photography&phrase=helen%20idahosa
http://www.iwrp.net/component/cwyniki/?view=contestant&id_zawodnik=12895

1972 births
Living people
Nigerian female weightlifters
Weightlifters at the 2000 Summer Olympics
Olympic weightlifters of Nigeria
Place of birth missing (living people)
World Weightlifting Championships medalists
20th-century Nigerian women
21st-century Nigerian women